Qaladərəsi
Böyük Galadərəsi
Kiçik Galadərəsi